Marian College is an independent Roman Catholic secondary day school for girls, located in the outer Melbourne suburb of Sunshine West, Victoria, Australia. The school was established in 1957 by the Brigidine Sisters and since 2014 now works under the governance of the Kildare Ministries. Marian College is one of seven Kildare Ministries secondary schools in Victoria and South Australia and continues to hold the Brigidine Tradition as a valuable and significant part of its heritage.

Marian College seeks to provide young women with the opportunity to be educated within a school environment that allows and encourages each person to develop fully as an individual, and as a community member. There are approximately 800 girls at the school.

See also

 List of non-government schools in Victoria
 Victorian Certificate of Education
 Vocational Education and Training
 Victorian Certificate of Applied Learning

References

External links
 School Website

Educational institutions established in 1958
Catholic secondary schools in Melbourne
Girls' schools in Victoria (Australia)
1958 establishments in Australia
Brigidine schools
Buildings and structures in the City of Brimbank
Sunshine, Victoria